The Mirage 30 SX is a Canadian sailboat, that was designed by Bruce Kirby as a racer and first built in 1985.

The Mirage 30 SX design is not related to the Mirage 30, but is instead a lightweight development of the Kirby 30, with a deeper elliptical shaped keel, a new rudder and a racing interior.

Production
The boat was built by Mirage Yachts in Canada, but it is now out of production. Only a small number were built.

Design
The Mirage 30 SX is a small racing keelboat, built predominantly of fiberglass. It has a fractional sloop rig, an internally-mounted spade-type rudder and a fixed fin keel. It displaces .

It is fitted with a Bukh DB 8 diesel engine.

The boat has a PHRF racing average handicap of 114 with a high of 108 and low of 120.

See also
List of sailing boat types

Related development
Kirby 30

Similar sailboats
Annie 30
Bahama 30
Bristol 29.9
Catalina 30
Catalina 309
C&C 30
C&C 30 Redwing
CS 30
Grampian 30
Hunter 29.5
Hunter 30
Hunter 30T
Hunter 30-2
Hunter 306
Kirby 30
Leigh 30
Mirage 30
Nonsuch 30
S2 9.2
Santana 30/30
Seafarer 30
Tanzer 31

References

Keelboats
1980s sailboat type designs
Sailing yachts
Sailboat type designs by Bruce Kirby
Sailboat types built by Mirage Yachts